Aime is a former commune in the Savoie département in the Auvergne-Rhône-Alpes region in south-eastern France. On 1 January 2016, it was merged into the new commune of Aime-la-Plagne. In 1972, the former communes of Longefoy, Tessens and Villette were merged with Aime.

Geography
The commune lies in the Tarentaise Valley, partly overlapping the ski resorts of La Plagne and Les Arcs.

Population

Transportation
The town is served by the Aime-La Plagne railway station, with rail connections to Bourg-Saint-Maurice, Albertville, Chambéry, Lyon and further.

See also
Communes of the Savoie department

References

Former communes of Savoie
Ceutrones